Jake Alan Young (born 22 July 2001) is an English professional footballer who plays as a forward for Barrow, on loan from Bradford City.

Career
Born in Huddersfield, Young moved from Shelley Juniors to Guiseley in 2017. He moved to Sheffield United in January 2019, before signing for Forest Green Rovers in July 2020. He scored his first goal for Forest Green Rovers in an EFL Trophy tie against West Bromwich Albion U21s on 6 October 2020.

In May 2022, Young signed for Bradford City for an undisclosed fee on a three-year deal. He said that working with manager Mark Hughes was the main attraction. He scored on his debut for the club, an equalising goal in an eventual 3–2 loss away at Barrow on 6 August 2022. By 8 September 2022 he had scored three goals in the past two games, but said that he aware that a first-team place was not guaranteed due to the size of the squad. His goal against Walsall was nominated for the League Two goal of the month for September. However, by January 2023 he had 
not played in the League since mid-September, and had only made two EFL Trophy appearances since (both in October), with Hughes saying that there were players ahead of him in the squad.

On 14 January 2023, Young joined EFL League Two side Barrow on loan for the remainder of the 2022–23 season. Barrow manager Pete Wild described Young as a "top player".

Personal life
Young played tennis as a youth, playing in national tournaments, but gave up the sport to pursue a football career.

Career statistics

Honours
Forest Green Rovers
League Two: 2021–22

References

2001 births
Living people
English footballers
Association football forwards
English Football League players
Guiseley A.F.C. players
Sheffield United F.C. players
Forest Green Rovers F.C. players
Bradford City A.F.C. players
Barrow A.F.C. players